Aulacoseira is a genus of diatoms belonging to the family Aulacoseiraceae.

The genus has cosmopolitan distribution.

Species:

Aulacoseira accincta 
Aulacoseira acicularia 
Aulacoseira aculeifera 
Aulacoseira granulata

References

Diatoms
Diatom genera